Henry Woodhouse may refer to:

 Henry Woodhouse (governor) (1573–1637), governor of Bermuda, 1623–1627
 Henry Woodhouse (MP) (1545–1624), English politician
 Henry Woodhouse (forger) (1884–1970), Italian-born US aviation writer, magazine publisher, investor, and collector